is a Japanese male curler.

At the national level, he is a four-time Japan men's champion curler (2000, 2001, 2002, 2003) and a 2013 Japan mixed doubles champion.

Teams

Men's

Mixed

Mixed doubles

References

External links

Video: 

Living people
1982 births
Japanese male curlers
Pacific-Asian curling champions
Japanese curling champions
Asian Games medalists in curling
Curlers at the 2003 Asian Winter Games
Curlers at the 2007 Asian Winter Games
Medalists at the 2003 Asian Winter Games
Medalists at the 2007 Asian Winter Games
Asian Games silver medalists for Japan
Place of birth missing (living people)
21st-century Japanese people